Terrance Alan "Tokey" Hill is an American karateka most well known for being the first male American to ever win a WUKO/WKF World Karate Championship which he achieved at the 1980 World Karate Championships in the 80 kg Kumite category. He also won a bronze medal in Kumite at the World Games 1981 He would open up his own school in 1983. He has also been a kickboxing coach for Michael McDonald
and later a karate coach for the USA National Karate-do Federation

Hill appeared in one film, the 1991 martial arts film American Shaolin. He appears in the film's opening as the coach of the film's villain, Trevor Gottitall, played by Trent Bushey.

Achievements
 First American to win a  WKF World Karate Championship
 Six times AAU/United States National Karate Championships
 World Games 1981 bronze medal

References

Living people
1958 births
Sportspeople from Chillicothe, Ohio
American male karateka
Karate coaches
Shotokan practitioners
Kickboxing trainers
World Games bronze medalists
Competitors at the 1981 World Games